Amanda Castro (October 12, 1962 – March 18, 2010) was a Honduran poet. She was awarded the Hoja del Laurel en Oro by then President of Honduras Manuel Zelaya.

Castro was born in Tegucigalpa. Her works include Celebración de Mujeres, Quizás la sangre, Poemas de amor propio y de propio amor, Una vez un barco, Pronombres de tratamiento en el español hondureño, La otra cara del sol,  and Viajes y sueños: reflexiones sobre creación e identidad y Otros testimonios: voces de mujeres centroamericanas. She also inspired the French novelist Thibaut Viné.

References 

1962 births
2010 deaths
20th-century Honduran poets
People from Tegucigalpa
Honduran women poets
20th-century Honduran women writers